Carlo Magini (1720–1806) was an Italian painter of the late-Baroque period and one of the most original of the 18th century Italian still life artists.

Life
He was born on 16 September 1720 in Fano, region of the Marche. Carlo was the son of Francis Magini, a goldsmith. His mother, Elizabeth Ceccarini, was the sister of the painter Sebastiano Ceccarini. Little is known about the details of the life of Carlo. It is possible he trained with his uncle Sebastiano. In 1736, the Oratorians in Perugia commissioned Sebastiano Ceccarini to paint frescos in the Chapel of the Crucifix in their church of San Filippo. Sebastiano Ceccarini asked to be allowed to bring his nephew to help. The nephew was likely Carlo Magini, who would follow his uncle during his journeys - through cities like Urbino, Perugia, Bologna, Florence and Venice between 1735 and 1738.  Carlo Magini was present in Rome in 1742 and in 1743.

By 1748 the artist had returned to Fano where he married Michelina Polinori of Pesaro on July 14 of that year. Their eldest daughter Francesca was born on 30 March 1750.  He remained active in his hometown where he died in 1806.

Work

Magini mainly painted still life subjects, mainly specialising in breakfast or bodegón style pieces, depicting mainly table settings with different, apparently unrelated, elements in juxtaposition.  He was also recorded, but far less recognized, as a portrait painter.  His known works amounting to about 100 canvases have been attributed on the basis of a number of signed pieces. A number of works are displayed at the Quadreria della Fondazione Cassa di Risparmio di Fano in Fano. It is difficult to establish a timeline for his still lifes as the works were never dated and rarely, if at all, documented.

His compositions appear simple, but are typically very artfully composed. Magini was interested in exploring the relationships between form, color, light, shadow and textures.   His canvases are all composed along the same severe lines, avoiding any baroque frivolity and yet achieve a highly original and effective naturalist aesthetic. The work of Magini stands in the tradition of Caravaggio, Velázquez and his near-contemporaries the Spaniard Luis Egidio Meléndez and the Frenchman Chardin.

Notes

External links

1720 births
1806 deaths
18th-century Italian painters
Italian male painters
19th-century Italian painters
Italian still life painters
People from Fano
19th-century Italian male artists
18th-century Italian male artists